Karen Yarbrough is an American politician currently serving as Cook County Clerk. Elected on November 6, 2018, she is the first female and African American to hold the position. Yarbrough previously served as Cook County Recorder of Deeds from 2012 to 2018 and as a member of the Illinois House of Representatives from 2001 to 2013. She became the interim Chair of the Democratic Party of Illinois after long-time chair Michael Madigan resigned from the position on February 22, 2021.

Education and career
Yarbrough earned a bachelor's degree in Business Administration from Chicago State University, a master’s in Inner City Studies from Northeastern Illinois University and attended nondegree executive education at the John F. Kennedy School of Government. Yarbrough is the founder and CEO of Hathaway Insurance Agency, where she has worked for thirty years.

Community involvement
Yarbrough has served as president of the Maywood Chamber of Commerce, and on the boards of United Way of Suburban Chicago and the Oak Park YMCA.

State Representative
In 1998, Yarbrough unsuccessfully challenged incumbent Eugene Moore in the Democratic primary for the 7th district seat in the Illinois House of Representatives.

Yarbrough ran again for the 7th district seat in the Illinois House of Representatives again in 2000, this time succeeding, unseating incumbent Wanda Sharp in the Democratic primary and winning the general election. Her term began in January, 2001, and she was later appointed an assistant majority leader. She served on several house committees (Housing and Urban Development (Chairwoman); House Insurance Committee (Vice-Chairwoman); Environmental Health Committee; Appropriations: Public Safety, Computer Technology) and was a member of the Illinois Legislative Black Caucus, and the Governor’s Safety and Re-Entry Commission.

Cook County Recorder of Deeds

Cook County Clerk

Vice chair of the Democratic Party of Illinois
Yarbrough serves as vice-chair of the Democratic Party of Illinois.

Yarbrough is regarded as an ally of former state party chairman Michael Madigan.

Personal life
Yarbrough's father, Don Williams, is an insurance agent and former village president of the Village of Maywood. She is married to Henderson Yarbrough, Sr., a current Maywood village trustee and former Maywood village president. They have seven grandchildren.

References

External links
Representative Karen A. Yarbrough official website
Illinois General Assembly - Representative Karen A. Yarbrough (D) 7th District official IL House website
Bills Committees
Project Vote Smart - Representative Karen A. Yarbrough (IL) profile
Follow the Money - Karen Yarbrough
2006 2004 2002 2000 1998 campaign contributions
Illinois House Democrats - Karen A. Yarbrough profile

1950 births
21st-century American politicians
21st-century American women politicians
American anti–death penalty activists
Chicago State University alumni
Cook County Clerks
Cook County Recorders of Deeds
Living people
Democratic Party members of the Illinois House of Representatives
Northeastern Illinois University alumni
People from Maywood, Illinois
People from Washington, D.C.
Women state legislators in Illinois